Bernhard Schachner (born 10 January 1986) is an Austrian footballer.

References

Austrian footballers
Austrian Football Bundesliga players
Austria under-21 international footballers
FC Admira Wacker Mödling players
1986 births
Living people

Association football midfielders